Cardinal Grimaldi may refer to:

Girolamo Grimaldi (died 1543)
Girolamo Grimaldi-Cavalleroni (died 1685)
Nicola Grimaldi I (died 1717)
Girolamo Grimaldi (1674–1733)